Quercus longinux is an uncommon Asian species of trees in the beech family Fagaceae. It has only been found in Taiwan. It is placed in subgenus Cerris, section Cyclobalanopsis.

Quercus longinux is a tree. Leaves can be as much as 8 cm long. Acorn is up to 12 mm long, narrower than those of most other species in the subgenus.

References

External links
line drawing, Flora of China Illustrations vol. 4, fig. 390, drawing 3 at upper right

longinux
Plants described in 1911
Endemic flora of Taiwan
Trees of Taiwan